RoboCop: Alpha Commando is a 1998–1999 animated series based on the Orion Pictures film RoboCop and the series/films that followed. It is the second animated version of the character, following on from RoboCop. The series premiered in first-run syndication on September 7, 1998, and ran until February 3, 1999. It was syndicated by The Summit Media Group. The show aired on Sinclair's KidsClick programming block in 2017 from July 1 to September 10. 40 episodes were produced.

Synopsis
The series is set in the year 2030 (2020 in the pilot episode), and deals with RoboCop being reactivated after five years offline to assist a federal high-tech group, "Alpha Division" in their vigilance and struggle against DARC (Directorate for Anarchy, Revenge, and Chaos), a highly advanced terrorist organization, and other forces of evil, whenever that may be, globally or nationally.

The series shared many of the same writers who had contributed to the 1980s animated series, but had even less in common with the films or television canon that it was based on: RoboCop has numerous gadgets in his body that were never in the film, such as roller skates and a parachute. The absence of Anne Lewis was never explained. Besides RoboCop / Alex J. Murphy himself, Sgt. Reed is the only character from the movies to be present in the series.

The show also suffers from major continuity errors: during the first episodes, RoboCop's son is shown in flashback memories and appears to be around 10; however, he later appears to be exactly of the same age and even wearing the same clothing. The names of RoboCop's wife and son were also changed to Susan and Richie; however, this is explained in episode 10: after Alex Murphy became RoboCop, his family was forced to change their identity to keep RoboCop's enemies from locating them.

Unlike the movies, and previous TV incarnations, RoboCop never takes off his helmet in Alpha Commando.

Voice cast
David Sobolov as RoboCop
Akiko Morison as Agent Nancy Miner
Dean Haglund as Dr. Cornelius Neumeier
Blu Mankuma as Sgt. Reed - Blu Mankuma, the voice actor for Sgt. Reed, was also in RoboCop: The Series where he played Sgt. Parks, the show's version of Reed.
Campbell Lane as the voice of Alpha Prime
Jim Byrnes as Mr. Brink, the leader of DARC
Saffron Henderson additional voices

Crew
 Executive story editors: Eric Lewald and Julia Lewald
 Writers: Cary Bates, Larry Braman, Carter Crocker, Steve Cuden, Mark Edens, Michael Edens, Adam Gilad, Sam Graham, Chris Hubbell, Peter Hunziker, Gary Stewart Kaplan, Ann Knapp, Eric Lewald, Julia Lewald, Steven Melching, Martha Moran, Richard Mueller, Cynthia Riddle, Erica Rothschild, Bruce Reid Schaefer, Douglas Sloan, Richard Stanley, Jan Strnad, Larry Swerdlove, Bruce Talkington, Len Uhley, Brooks Wachtel, Len Wein, Russ Weiderspahn
 Produced and directed by Larry Houston

Episodes

References

External links 
 
 
 Official page on KidsClick

1990s American animated television series
1990s American science fiction television series
1998 American television series debuts
1999 American television series endings
1990s Canadian animated television series
1990s Canadian science fiction television series
1998 Canadian television series debuts
1999 Canadian television series endings
Alpha Commando
First-run syndicated television programs in the United States
Television series by MGM Television
Fiction set in 2030
Television series set in 2030
Television series set in the 2030s
Television series set in the future
Animated television shows based on films
Works by Len Wein
Cyborgs in television
American children's animated superhero television series
American children's animated action television series
American children's animated adventure television series
American children's animated science fiction television series
American sequel television series
Animated television series about robots
Canadian children's animated superhero television series
Canadian children's animated action television series
Canadian children's animated adventure television series
Canadian children's animated science fiction television series
Television series by Metro-Goldwyn-Mayer Animation
KidsClick